is a retired judoka who competed in the middleweight (−80 kg) division in the 1964 Summer Olympics.

Biography
Okano entered the 1964 Summer Olympics while studying at Chuo University's law school, and won the gold medal in the middleweight division. He won another gold medal at the World Judo Championships in 1965, becoming the champion of his division at only 21 years of age. He also won the open-weight class division of the All-Japan Judo Championships in 1967 and 1969, and placed second in 1968. At 80 kg, he and Shinobu Sekine remain the lightest ever competitors to win these championships. Okano suddenly retired from competitive judo at only 25 years of age, and founded the Sekijuku (currently the Ryutsu Keizai University's judo team) in 1970, where he instructed future Olympic gold medalist Kazuhiro Ninomiya. He also served as a coach for the Japanese team during the 1976 Summer Olympics. He later worked as a judo instructor at Keio University from 1989 to 1998, and the University of Tokyo from 1989 to 2000.  He is a retired professor and Head of the Judo Department at Ryutsu Keizai University. He has held the judo rank of 6th dan for more than 40 years. Isao Okano is the author of Vital Judo, which was published in 1976. Okano is famously known for his seoinage, kouchi gari and osoto gari.

Also known as a master in the field of newaza, Okano is considered by some an important contributor to the late art of Brazilian jiu-jitsu. He was a teacher to Brazilian jiu-jitsu black belts like Joe Moreira, Fredson Paixao, Edson Carvalho and Oswaldo Alves, with the last citing their training with Okano as instrumental for the development of sweeps, side control and guard work in modern jiu-jitsu.

See also
List of judoka
List of Olympic medalists in judo
seoinage

References

External links

 
  Competition videos of Isao Okano at Judovision

1944 births
Living people
Japanese male judoka
Judoka at the 1964 Summer Olympics
Olympic judoka of Japan
Olympic gold medalists for Japan
People from Ibaraki Prefecture
Olympic medalists in judo
Medalists at the 1964 Summer Olympics